Kaja may refer to:

 Kaja (name), a given name, a nickname and a surname
 Kaja (singer), stage name of Vesna Milačić (born 1968), Montenegrin singer-songwriter
 Kaja (newspaper), a newspaper published in Estonia between 1919 and 1935
 Kajagoogoo, a British new wave band known as Kaja from 1984 to 1985
 KAJA (FM), a radio station (97.3 FM) licensed to San Antonio, Texas, United States
 K68DJ, a television station (channel 68) licensed to Corpus Christi, Texas, United States, unofficially known as "KAJA"
 Kaja Beedi, an India beedi brand

See also
 
 Kaia (disambiguation)
 Kakinada Kaaja, an Indian sweet delicacy
 Khaja, a type of Indian pastry
 Kaya (disambiguation)